Marc-César Scotto (1888 – 6 February 1960) was a Monegasque composer. His work was part of the art competitions at the 1928 Summer Olympics, the 1932 Summer Olympics, and the 1936 Summer Olympics.

References

1888 births
1960 deaths
Monegasque composers
Male composers
Olympic competitors in art competitions
Place of birth missing
20th-century male musicians